The Master of the Mansi Magdalen (c.1490 – 1530), was an Early Netherlandish painter.

Biography
He was active in Antwerp and is possibly the same person as Willem Meulenbroec, an artist registered in 1501 as a pupil of Quentin Matsys.

References

Master of the Mansi Magdalen on Artnet

1490s births
1530 deaths
Early Netherlandish painters
Artists from Antwerp